Choe Byeong-chan (born 4 April 1996) is a South Korean professional footballer who plays as a midfielder for K League 1 side Gimcheon Sangmu.

Club career
Choe made his professional debut for Seongnam in the K League 2 on 1 April 2018 against Chungnam Asan. He started and played 42 minutes before being substituted off as Seongnam won 1–0. He then scored his first professional goal a month later on 12 May against Gwangju. His 39th-minute goal was the second in a 3–1 victory. Choe then scored a brace for Seongnam on 30 June 2018 during a 2–1 victory over Bucheon 1995.

Choe scored his first goal in the first division K League 1 on 19 May 2019 in a 2–1 defeat against Gangwon.

Career statistics

Club

References

External links
Profile at the Seongnam FC website

1996 births
Association football midfielders
Bucheon FC 1995 players
Gimcheon Sangmu FC players
K League 1 players
K League 2 players
Living people
South Korean footballers
Seongnam FC players